Riverfenix is the first full-length album by Riverfenix, released on December 16, 1997 on Drive-Thru Records. Most of the album's songs were re-recorded for Fenix TX (released by both Drive-Thru and major label MCA Records), when Riverfenix was forced to change their name.  This album has since been out of print and is a treasured collector's item among fans as "Skinhead Jessie", "Jaw" and the untitled tracks are not featured on the Fenix TX version release. "Apple Pie Cowboy Toothpaste" and "Jolly Green Dumbass" also featured short intros while "Rooster Song" had a slightly different sound and featured a small message within the silence leading into the second untitled track.

Track listing
(all songs written by Riverfenix)
"Apple Pie Cowboy Toothpaste" – 4:58
"G.B.O.H." – 3:18
"Minimum Wage" – 1:57
"All My Fault" – 2:51
"Jolly Green Dumbass" – 3:06
"Skinhead Jessie" – 2:50
"Ben" – 3:17
"Speechless" – 4:10
"Jean Claude Trans Am" – 2:27
Untitled intro to "Philosophy" – 0:33
"Philosophy" – 2:10
"Jaw" – 3:48
"No Lie" – 2:41
"Rooster Song" – 4:04
"City of the Dead" hidden track – 4:55
Untitled outro – 0:31

Personnel
Riverfenix
Will Salazar (credited as The Silky Smooth Ninja) – guitar, vocals
Damon DeLaPaz (credited as M.C. Treefrog) – guitar, vocals
Adam Lewis (credited as Brother Quaddel Hicks) – bass guitar
Donnie Reyes (credited as Tofu) – drums

Additional personnel
Louis Castle – trumpet
Danny Rukasin – trombone
Ro Sahebi – additional guitar
Rich Zahniser – trombone

References 

1997 albums
Fenix TX albums
Drive-Thru Records albums